The 1896 Lehigh football team was an American football team that represented Lehigh University as an independent during the 1896 college football season. In its first and only season under head coach L. N. Morris, the team compiled a 2–5 record and was outscored by a total of 130 to 80.

Schedule

References

Lehigh
Lehigh Mountain Hawks football seasons
Lehigh football